Pryamaya Balka is a rural locality (a selo) and the administrative center of Pryamobalkinskoye Rural Settlement, Dubovsky District, Volgograd Oblast, Russia. The population was 645 as of 2010. There are 17 streets.

Geography 
Pryamaya Balka is located on the right bank of the Olenya River, 32 km northwest of Dubovka (the district's administrative centre) by road. Davydovka is the nearest rural locality.

References 

Rural localities in Dubovsky District, Volgograd Oblast